CDisplay is a freeware comic book archive viewer and sequential image viewer utility for Microsoft Windows used to view images one at a time in the style of a comic book. It popularized the comic book archive file format. CDisplay was written to easily view JPEG, PNG and static GIF format images sequentially. The program was designed to be less general purpose than existing image viewer programs, and more convenient for simply viewing images sequentially.

Features
 Loads JPEG, PNG, and static GIF images which are automatically ordered alphabetically and presented for viewing one at a time or two at a time.
 The images may be viewed from a folder or collected in a .zip, .rar, .ace, or .tar archive file.
 Page through the images sequentially and scroll around pages with single key presses.
 Many automatic page sizing options including choices to display one or two pages at one time. Image resizing uses Lanczos resampling for the best picture quality.
 No bloat caused by non-essential general purpose image processing features.
 Users can view the pictures as full screen (with or without mouse pointer) or in a window.

Files
CDisplay supports Comic Book Archive files, archives of individual page images with the extension .cbr, .cbz, .cbt, or .cba; they are simply renamed RAR, ZIP, TAR, or ACE archive files. The standard icon for all comic file types extension is a comic balloon. The format was made popular by CDisplay but is now used by many other programs designed for reading comics.

CDisplay supports the display of JPEG, PNG, GIF, BMP, TXT,  and also SFV files which confirm that the file is not corrupt, either directly or contained within archive files.

 If a .txt file is within a folder or comic book archive file, it displays the comic's contents on file opening.
 If a .sfv file is within a folder or comic book archive file, it verifies the SFV data to confirm that the rest of the content is not corrupted.
 Automatic colour balance and yellow reduction if desired.

Development 

The program was compiled using Borland C++ Builder 5.0 and runs on 32- and 64-bit versions of Windows platforms from Windows 98 onwards.

The source code was not made available, and the program ceased to be maintained when the author died in 2003.

See also 
 Comparison of image viewers

References

External links
 CDisplay, semi-official website

Image viewers
Windows-only freeware
2003 software